Legend of the Black Shawarma is the seventh studio album by psychedelic trance duo Infected Mushroom released on September 8, 2009. The album is named after a shawarma, a Middle Eastern wrap/sandwich; the equivalent of the döner kebab in Turkey or the gyros in Greece. The title was also inspired by Shawarma Hazan, a shawarma restaurant where Erez and Amit used to eat in their hometown, Haifa.

History
Infected Mushroom had originally intended for the album to be a concept album, the concept being a food diary of the group's favorite restaurants. Thus came the first tracks written for the album, named after the restaurants Poquito Mas, Saeed, Franks, and most notably Shawarma Hazan. However, the group eventually decided to break off from this concept, with songs such as the lead single, Smashing the Opponent.

Tracks
 "Poquito Mas" (Spanish for "Little Bit More" ) – 3:39
 "Saeed" (سعيد, Arabic for "Happy") – 7:03
 "End of the Road"  – 6:47
 "Smashing the Opponent" (Vocals: Jonathan Davis of Korn) – 4:10
 "Can't Stop" – 7:23
 "Herbert the Pervert" – 7:17
 "Killing Time" (Vocals: Perry Farrell of Jane's Addiction) – 3:04
 "Project 100" – 9:38
 "Franks" – 8:05
 "Slowly" – 9:00
 "The Legend of the Black Shawarma" – 7:11
 "Riders on the Storm" (Remix of song by The Doors) – 4:29
 "Bust a Move" (Infected Mushroom Remix) – 9:10 (iTunes Bonus track, included as the 7th track on the album)

Personnel
Brian Porizek – art direction, design
 Jeff McMillan – cover artwork
UZIgraphics – design (logo)
Paul Oakenfold – executive producer
 Infected Mushroom – performers

Charts

References

2009 albums
Infected Mushroom albums